Ottawa High School is a public high school located in Ottawa, Kansas, operated by Ottawa USD 290 public school district, serving students in grades 9-12.  Its athletic teams, known as the Cyclones, compete in the Frontier Athletic League. The principal is Kelly Whittaker, the assistant principal is Jason Hagg, and the athletic director is Brad Graf. The current enrollment of the school is approximately 689 students, and the school has 102 teachers, secretaries, paras, and nurses. Ottawa Middle School is its main feeder school.

History
The original Ottawa school district was established on November 12, 1864.  The first term of Ottawa Public School (then the only school in the county) was held from 1864 to 1865 in the upstairs of a building on Second Street and Main Street.  The first school building was built in 1866 and served until 1872.   A newer school, referred to as Central School, was built at Fifth Street and Main Street and served until 1898 when it was renamed Washington School until 1927.  In 1917, adjacent to Washington School, a new building designed by architect George Washburn's son officially became Ottawa High School.  This new school served the community for 51 years before a new school on Ash Street replaced it in 1968. Later, in 1978, wood and metal shops were added. The latest addition was created in 1990.

Academics
Ottawa High School operates on a 7:45am to 3:10pm school day with 7 classes each day.  Ottawa High School offers a wide variety of classes geared towards the specific abilities and interests of its students. In addition to the standard curriculum, the school also has various courses geared towards the preparation of students for college or university-level education. College prep courses are offered in English, government and economics.

Ottawa High School also offers college classes via Neosho County Community College, classes on the Spanish  language, and visual and performing arts classes such as basic/advanced art, clay construction, debate, forensics, theatre, band, and various vocal classes.

Ottawa High also has a newspaper class that electronically publishes The Review, with physical copies released near the end of each semester, and a yearbook class that annually puts out The Record.

Extracurricular activities 
The Cyclones compete in the Frontier League and are classified as a 4A school according to the KSHSAA. Throughout its history, Ottawa High School has won several state championships in various sports and activities.

Athletics 
Ottawa High School offers the following sports:

Fall
 Football
 Volleyball
 Boys' Cross-Country
 Girls' Cross-Country
 Boys' Soccer
 Girls' Tennis
 Cheerleading
 Dance Team (Cyclonettes)

Winter
 Boys' Basketball
 Girls' Basketball
 Wrestling
 Winter Cheerleading
 Dance Team (Cyclonettes)

Spring
 Baseball
 Boys' Golf
 Boys' Tennis
 Girls' Soccer
 Softball
 Boys' Track and Field
 Girls' Track and Field

State championships

Drama and theatre

Fall musical and spring play
Every year the Ottawa High School music department presents a fall musical. The performance is run by a student cast, stage crew, tech crew, and pit, and is put on at the Ottawa Municipal Auditorium.

Ottawa High School puts on a play every spring at the Ottawa Municipal Auditorium with a student cast and crew.

Debate and forensics
Many Ottawa students participate in speaking and acting competitions throughout the school year. During the fall, Ottawa's Debate team is active, and during the spring the Forensics teams is active. Both teams, composed of 9th–12th graders, compete on Saturdays at area high schools.  Ottawa annually hosts both debate and forensics tournaments. When competing nationally, Ottawa competes in the National Catholic Forensic League.

Other
Ottawa High School students actively participate in Student Council (STUCO). It also has a state-qualifying Scholar's Bowl team, a branch of the National Honor Society, a state-qualifying chess team, and a successful Science Olympiad competition team.

Notable alumni
 Steve Grogan, former New England Patriots quarterback, led Ottawa to a runner-up place in state football and to a state championship in basketball
 Don Harrison, news anchor, one of the original anchors of CNN Headline News
 Semi Ojeleye, forward for the Milwaukee Bucks, selected 37th overall in the 2nd round of the 2017 NBA Draft. Ojeleye led Ottawa to a state championship and the school's all-time best record of 25–0 in 2013. 
 Stanley Sheldon, bassist and vocalist for Peter Frampton, most notably on Frampton's Frampton Comes Alive! album
John G. Thompson, mathematician, awarded the Fields Medal in 1970

References

External links

 Ottawa High School Website
 Ottawa USD 290 Website
 School Newspaper
 OHS in the 50s Alumni Website

Public high schools in Kansas
Schools in Franklin County, Kansas
Buildings and structures in Ottawa, Kansas
1917 establishments in Kansas